Le Tampon is the fourth-largest commune in the French overseas department and region of Réunion. It is located on the south-central part of the island of Réunion, adjacent to Saint Pierre.

In the early twentieth century, the town was the base for the murderer and sorcerer Sitarane.

Geography

Climate
Le Tampon has an oceanic climate (Köppen climate classification Cfb).

Population

See also
Communes of the Réunion department
Tampon

References

External links
Official website (in French)

Communes of Réunion